Margan-e Qadim (also Romanized as Margan-e Qadīm; also known as Margan) is a village in Qarah Quyun-e Jonubi Rural District, Qarah Quyun District, Showt County, West Azerbaijan Province, Iran. At the 2006 census, its population was 747, in 157 families. After the census, the villages of Margan-e Azizabad, Margan-e Esmail Kandi, Margan-e Qadim, and Margan-e Vasat merged to form the new city of Marganlar.

References 

Populated places in Showt County